Mud is a 2012 American coming-of-age drama film written and directed by Jeff Nichols. In the film Tye Sheridan and Jacob Lofland portray a pair of teenagers who encounter the eponymous Mud (Matthew McConaughey), a fugitive hiding on a small island, and agree to help him evade his pursuers. Sam Shepard and Reese Witherspoon also star.

Mud competed for the Palme d'Or at the 2012 Cannes Film Festival and was also shown at the Sundance Film Festival in January 2013. It opened on April 26, 2013 with a limited release in select theaters, before having a wide release on May 10. Mud performed well at the box office, grossing $32.6 million on a $10 million budget, and received critical acclaim.

Plot
Ellis and Neckbone, two teenage boys living in the DeWitt, Arkansas area, find a boat stuck on a small island in the Mississippi River. They meet the occupant, a man named Mud, who claims to have grown up nearby. Mud tells the boys that he needs food. Mud promises that in exchange for their help, they can have the boat after he's gone.

Returning with food, the boys ask Mud why he is hiding out. Mud is waiting for his girlfriend Juniper, whom he describes as beautiful with nightingale tattoos on her hands. They later spot Juniper in town. Ellis falls for a high-school girl named May Pearl.

Ellis learns that his parents are heading for divorce. This threatens their old river houseboat: if no longer used as a residence by the owner, it will be removed by the River Authority. Later, at a roadblock, Ellis finds out Mud is a fugitive but denies having seen him.

Ellis and Neckbone confront Mud over the discovery. Mud explains that he killed a man who had gotten Juniper pregnant and pushed her down a flight of stairs, causing her to lose the child. The boys decide to help Mud in exchange for his pistol.

Mud sends Ellis to Tom Blankenship, an older father figure from his childhood, for help. Tom agrees to come talk to Mud; however, upon learning Mud is in trouble over Juniper again, he refuses to help. Mud gives the boys a note for Juniper. They find her motel room where Carver - the brother of the man Mud killed - is abusing her. Ellis charges at the man but is quickly overpowered. Neckbone and Ellis tell Mud about the man. Mud realizes that the family of the man he killed is here for revenge.

Carver, his father King, and a handful of bounty hunters stake out Juniper's motel. They have paid off officers in local and state police.

Stealing machine parts and an outboard motor from junkyards, the boys help Mud repair the boat. They plan to reunite Juniper with Mud. They relay the plan to Juniper, who agrees to it. However, she instead heads to a bar and flirts with other men. Ellis and Neckbone tell Mud.

Ellis brings a note from Mud to Juniper, telling her it's over between them. Juniper tells Ellis that Mud is a born liar and she's sick of running away with him. Ellis is dejected, not only because he thought he was helping a couple in love, but furthered by May Pearl's rejection of him in front of her friends and not returning his calls.

Ellis confronts Mud and calls him a liar and a coward, and that he turned them into thieves. Running away, Ellis falls into a pit containing cottonmouths and is bitten. Mud jumps in and rescues Ellis. Mud races to get the unconscious Ellis to a clinic on the mainland. Recognizing Mud, one of the hospital employees calls the police, who tip off Carver.

Evading his pursuers, Mud gets back to the island where he and Neckbone get the repaired boat into the water. As they agreed before, Mud gives Neckbone a pistol but without ammunition. Mud wants to say good-bye to Ellis, so Neckbone takes him to the houseboat where he is recovering. While Mud is in Ellis' room, Carver and his posse arrive and start shooting. Tom fires from his boat using his old sniper rifle, killing several attackers from across the river. Mud saves Ellis and tries to get away but is shot as he dives into the river. The police arrive and find all the posse members dead. One trooper calls King to tell him that his other son is now dead. The morning after the shootout, Tom disappears.

Ellis's parents separate. He and his mother move to an apartment in town and their houseboat is demolished, while his father gets a new job far away. He tells Ellis to take care of his mother as he departs, showing a more mature & changed attitude toward their situation. Before he leaves, he tells Ellis, "I love you" to which Ellis replies, "I love you too." Ellis sees some attractive older teenage girls in his new neighborhood and smiles. He is uncertain of Mud's fate, but still believes he was protecting Juniper.

Mud is revealed to be alive and recovering on the repaired boat driven by Tom. Many days have passed, and the film ends with them looking ahead at the mouth of the Mississippi River, and south of that, the Gulf of Mexico.

Cast

Production
Jeff Nichols wrote and directed Mud, which was fully financed by Everest Entertainment and produced by Everest and FilmNation Entertainment. Nichols came up with the concept for the film in the 1990s. While still a student, Nichols began developing the story, inspired by Mark Twain's works, including the 1876 novel Tom Sawyer. He also sought to reflect the theme of love: "I wanted to capture a point in my life in high school when I had crushes on girls and it totally broke my heart and it was devastating. I wanted to try and bottle that excitement and that pain and that intensity of being in love and being a teenager."

Nichols always had McConaughey in mind, after seeing him in Lone Star (1996). In May 2011, Chris Pine was first in talks for the lead role. McConaughey was cast as Mud the following August and was joined by Reese Witherspoon. Witherspoon was at the same agency as Nichols, so he was able to approach her for the role of Juniper.

For the local boys of a small Delta town, Nichols cast boys who could already pilot boats and ride dirt bikes, instead of ones who would have to be taught on set. For the teenage role of Neckbone, over  auditioned, and 15-year-old Jacob Lofland from Yell County, Arkansas, was cast.

He filmed in Southeast Arkansas; locations included Dumas (in the Arkansas Delta Lowlands area), De Witt, Lake Village (near the Mississippi River), Crocketts Bluff (on the White River), and Stuttgart. The island in the film was located in the Mississippi River outside the city of Eudora. The cast and crew numbered over 100 people, around half of whom were Arkansas residents. Over 400 locals were also involved as extras. According to the state government's Economic Development Commission, "Mud is the largest production ever to be filmed in the state." Nichols said about filming in parts of Southeast Arkansas, "These places and people have such a particular accent and culture, and they're quickly getting homogenized. I wanted to capture a snapshot of a place that probably won't be there forever."

Mud's cinematographer Adam Stone used a Steadicam for filming. Stone, who was also cinematographer for Nichols's previous films Shotgun Stories and Take Shelter, said, "If you look at Shotgun Stories, the camera is fairly moored. With Take Shelter, we had a lot more dolly work. In Mud, the camera never really sits still. The locations were either super-remote or really small and cramped, so the Steadicam was the only thing that could get in there." The film was shot on Kodak VISION3 35mm film stocks in the anamorphic format with Panavision G-Series lenses.

Release
Reuters reported that the film "[earned] warm applause at a press screening". Varietys film critics Justin Chang and Peter Debruge considered Mud one of their favorites of the film festival. Debruge said the film was reminiscent of the novel Huckleberry Finn: "It so elegantly addresses what masculinity and family really mean in the heartland." He said the Mississippi River in Mud was "a mythic backdrop... in which old values struggle against stronger modern forces in the world".

British film critic Peter Bradshaw of The Guardian gave the film three out of five stars, stating that "Mud is an engaging and good-looking picture with two bright leading performances".

After its Cannes premiere, no distributor immediately purchased rights to release the film in the United States. By August 2012, Lionsgate and Roadside Attractions acquired rights to distribute Mud in the United States. In January 2013, Mud screened at the 2013 Sundance Film Festival, and the Austin American-Statesman reported, "His modern take on Mark Twain played to an enthusiastic sold-out crowd of more than 500 people."

Reception

Box office
The film ended up earning $21,590,086 in North America and $11,023,087 in other markets for a worldwide total of $32,613,173, against a $10 million budget.

Critical response
Mud received positive reviews from critics. On Rotten Tomatoes the film has an approval rating of 98% based on 171 reviews, with an average rating of 8/10. The site's critical consensus reads, "Bolstered by a strong performance from Matthew McConaughey in the title role, Mud offers an engaging Southern drama that manages to stay sweet and heartwarming without being sappy." On Metacritic, the film has a score of 76 out of 100 based on 35 critics, indicating "generally favorable reviews".

David Denby, writing in The New Yorker, praised the director: "Nichols has developed a talent for intimacy and for continuous tension—he could be developing into one of the great movie storytellers...[the film, as a whole] plays with a depth and psychological acuteness almost never found in our movies anymore." Quoting The Wrap's report that the film played very strongly in the South, Godfrey Cheshire writes that he was not surprised: "Mud is the best Southern film I've seen in ages." Singling out McConaughey's performance, The Village Voice described it as "the latest in McConaughey's campaign for reconsideration as a great American actor".

Accolades
Mud has received numerous awards and nominations. It received the Robert Altman Award at the 29th Independent Spirit Awards for its film director, casting director, and ensemble cast. The Independent Spirit Awards also nominated Jeff Nichols for Best Director.

Tye Sheridan was nominated for the Critics' Choice Award for Best Young Actor/Actress. The film received the Grand Prix from the Belgian Film Critics Association.

Mud was named one of the Top Ten Independent Films of 2013 by the National Board of Review.

References

External links

 
 
 
 

2012 films
2012 drama films
2010s coming-of-age drama films
2012 independent films
American coming-of-age drama films
American independent films
2010s English-language films
Films directed by Jeff Nichols
Films set in Arkansas
Films shot in Arkansas
Films set on islands
Lionsgate films
Roadside Attractions films
Southern Gothic films
2010s American films